Elsdon is a village and civil parish in the English county of Northumberland about  to the southwest of Rothbury. The name is derived from the Old English meaning Elli's valley.

Formerly the capital of Redesdale, Elsdon contains a very fine example of a Motte and Bailey Castle, and a near perfect Pele Tower (fortified house of a type found in the border country) which is a private residence.

Geographically, Elsdon lies in Redesdale and, as a market town, was once the primary settlement in the area.

History 

Elsdon has a grim reminder of the past in the gibbet that rears its gaunt outline on the hill known as Steng Cross. Strangely enough this gallows has no connection with the Border raiders, many of whom met their death "high on the gallows tree". The present gibbet stands on the site of one from which the body of William Winter was suspended in chains after he had been hanged at The Westgate in Newcastle. Today this grisly relic is called Winter's Gibbet. Pieces of the gibbet were once reputed to be able to cure toothache, if rubbed on the gums.

In 1791, a very nasty murder of an old woman, Margaret Crozier,  took place. The following quote from Tomlinson's Guide to Northumberland shows the enjoyment which the old writers took in recounting horrors in all their bloodthirsty detail. Tomlinson says:

Believing her to be rich, one William Winter, a desperate character, but recently returned from transportation, at the instigation, and with the assistance of two female faws [vendors of crockery and tinwork] named Jane and Eleanor Clark, who in their wanderings had experienced the kindness of Margaret Crozier, broke into the lonely Pele on the night of 29th August 1791, and cruelly murdered the poor old woman, loading the ass they had brought with her goods.

The day before they had rested and dined in a sheep fold on Whisker-shield Common, which overlooked the Raw, and it was from a description given of them by a shepherd boy, who had seen them and taken particular notice of the number and character of the nails in Winter's shoes, and also the peculiar gully, or butcher's knife with which he divided the food that brought them to justice.

The shepherd lad must have had very good eyesight to count the number of nails in Winter's shoes! That "shepherd lad" was Robert Hindmarsh of Whisker-shield, aged eleven. He reported the fact that there was a stranger in the vicinity of the murder to the authorities. His witness account led to the apprehension and conviction of William Winter. Much later, Robert Baden Powell took great interest in Hindmarsh's observational skills and subsequent action, and included the "lad's" attention to detail as a shining example to his new Boy Scout movement. In "Scouting for Boys" (1908) Baden Powell both compliments Hindmarsh's skills as an exemplar to Scouts, and included an imaginary sketch of the encounter between Winter and Hindmarsh; when the "nails in the boots" were counted.

Present on the village green is a Pinfold, where stray livestock were kept in years past, pending the payment of a fine by their owners. Also present is the site of an old cockfighting ring and at the North end of the village green is a stone, which once held a ring to which bulls were tied for bull baiting. Up to the late 16th century, this was an almost lawless place, confirmed by the signs of these "pastimes" and the marks just inside the church where parishioners sharpened swords and arrowheads on the church pillars! Between the Motte & Bailey Castle and the Pele tower is some flat land known as the Haugh, where in antiquity, the men of Elsdon practised archery. This is not the countryside of Morris Dancers and Cricket, but an area, which remained beyond the law long after England and Scotland were settled, and in some ways this harshness and the lack of facilities are what has preserved Elsdon as a truly unspoilt Northumbrian Village.

Economy 
Whilst some new building has been allowed, like many other small villages, Elsdon has suffered for the loss of its shop and Post Office in recent times. There is however still a public house, the Bird and Bush, and a tea room and cafe situated at the Northern end of the village, which is especially popular with cyclists and other visitors.

Landmarks 
 
Elsdon Castle was a castle in the village and is a scheduled monument. It is probably the best preserved medieval motte and bailey castle site in Northumberland and was built by Robert de Umfraville, not long after the Norman Conquest. Impressive earthworks remain.

Elsdon Tower is a medieval tower house converted for use as a Rectory and is a Grade I listed building. The property was first recorded in the occupation of the Rector of Elsdon in 1415.

The tower was reduced in the 17th century to three stories with a steeply sloping roof above a castellated parapet In the early 19th century Archdeacon Singleton built an entrance porch and a two-storey, two bayed house extension.

Religious sites 

Close to the fortified vicarage is Elsdon's church which claims to have been a resting place for St. Cuthbert's body and is one of the many dedicated to his memory. Of much historical interest, it is also larger than many Northumbrian churches. In the nineteenth century when alterations were taking place, a large number of skeletons were discovered which appeared to have been buried in a communal grave, an indication that the bodies had been buried at Elsdon after the Battle of Otterburn.

See also 
Elsdon Castle
Elsdon Tower
Billsmoor Park and Grasslees Wood SSSI

References

External links 

Local history and statistics
Panoramic Photographs of St. Cuthberts Church by Peter Loud
A series of photographs
GENUKI(tm) page

Villages in Northumberland